Michelle Carla Cliff (2 November 1946 – 12 June 2016) was a Jamaican-American author whose notable works included Abeng  (1985), No Telephone to Heaven (1987), and Free Enterprise (2004).

In addition to novels, Cliff also wrote short stories, prose poems and works of literary criticism. Her works explore the various complex identity problems that stem from the experience of post-colonialism, as well as the difficulty of establishing an authentic individual identity in the face of race and gender constructs. A historical revisionist, many of Cliff's works seek to advance an alternative view of history against established mainstream narratives. She often referenced her writing as an act of defiance—a way to reclaim a voice and build a narrative in order to speak out against the unspeakable by tackling issues of sex and race.

Identifying as biracial and bisexual, Cliff, who had both Jamaican and American citizenship, used her voice to create a body of work filled with prose poetry, novels, and short stories. Her writings were enriched by the power, privilege and pain of her multi-locatedness to creatively reimagine Caribbean identity.

Biography
Cliff was born in Kingston, Jamaica, in 1946 and moved with her family to New York City three years later. Her father was Carl Cliff and her mother was Lilla Brennan. Cliff has described her family as "Jamaica white", Jamaicans of mostly European ancestry, but later began to identify as a light-skinned Black woman. Responding to a description of her in the West Indian anthology "Her True True Name" as being light-skinned enough to be functionally white, Cliff rejected the notion that a person has "a white outlook just because you look white." She moved back to Jamaica in 1956 and attended St Andrew High School for Girls, where she kept a diary and began writing, before returning to New York City in 1960. She was educated at Wagner College (New York) where she graduated with a B.A. in European History and the Warburg Institute at the University of London where she did post graduate work in Renaissance studies, focusing specifically on the Italian Renaissance. She has held academic positions at several colleges including Trinity College and Emory University.

From 1999, Cliff lived in Santa Cruz, California, with her partner, the American poet Adrienne Rich. The two had been partners since 1976; Rich died in 2012.

Cliff died of liver failure on 12 June 2016.

Career and works
Her first published work came in the form of the book Claiming an Identity They Taught Me to Despise, which covered the many ways Cliff herself experienced racism and prejudice.

Having found fellowship and community with African American and Latina feminists, Cliff's work thrived and contributed to enabling other voices to be heard. Cliff was a contributor to the 1983 Black feminist anthology Home Girls: A Black Feminist Anthology.

In 1984, Cliff published Abeng, a semi autobiographical novel that explores topics of female sexual subjectivity and Jamaican identity. Next came The Land of Look Behind: Prose and Poetry (1985), which uses the Jamaican folk world, its landscape and culture to examine identity.

Cliff's second novel, No Telephone to Heaven, was published in 1987. At the heart of this novel, which continues the story of Clare Savage from her first novel, Abeng, she explores the need to reclaim a suppressed African past.

Her works were also anthologized in a collection edited by Barbara Smith and Gloria Anzaldúa for Making Face, Making Soul: Creative and Critical Writing by Feminists of Color (1990).

From 1990 on, Cliff's work is seen as having taken a more global focus, especially with her first collection of short stories, Bodies of Water. In 1993 she published her third novel, Free Enterprise, and in 1998 she published another collection of short stories, The Store of a Million Items. Both works continue her pursuit of readdressing historical injustices.

She continued to work throughout the 2000s, releasing several collections of essays and short stories including If I Could Write This Fire (2008) and Everything Is Now: New and Collected Short Stories (2009). Her final novel, Into The Interior, was published in 2010.

By 2015, Cliff took part in many literary projects, including translating into English the works of several writers, poets and creatives such as Argentinean poet Alfonsina Storni; Spanish poet and dramatist, Federico García Lorca and Italian poet, film director and philosopher Pier Paolo Pasolini.

Fiction
 2010: Into the Interior (University of Minnesota Press). Novel
 2009: Everything is Now: New and Collected Stories (University of Minnesota Press). Short stories
 2004: Free Enterprise: A Novel of Mary Ellen Pleasant (City Lights Publishers). Novel
 1998: The Store of a Million Items (New York: Houghton Mifflin Company). Short stories 
 1993: Free Enterprise: A Novel of Mary Ellen Pleasant (New York: Dutton). Novel 
 1990: Bodies of Water (New York: Dutton). Short stories 
 1987: No Telephone to Heaven (New York: Dutton). Novel (sequel to Abeng)
 1984: Abeng (New York: Penguin). Novel

Prose poetry
 1985: The Land of Look Behind and Claiming (Firebrand Books).
 1980: Claiming an Identity They Taught Me to Despise (Persephone Press).

Editor
 1982: Lillian Smith, The Winner Names the Age: A Collection of Writings (New York: Norton).

Other
 2008: If I Could Write This in Fire. University of Minnesota Press. Non-fiction collection. 
 1982: "If I Could Write This in Fire I Would Write This in Fire", in Barbara Smith (ed.), Home Girls: A Black Feminist Anthology (New York: Kitchen Table: Women of Color Press).
 1994: "History as Fiction, Fiction as History", Ploughshares, Fall 1994; 20(2–3): 196–202.
 1990: "Object into Subject: Some Thoughts on the Work of Black Women's Artists," in Gloria Anzaldúa (ed.), Making Face, Making Soul/Haciendo Caras: Creative and Critical Perspectives by Women of Color (San Francisco: Aunt Lute), pp. 271–290.

Feminism 
In 1981, Cliff became an associate of the Women's Institute for Freedom of the Press.

Further reading
 Curry, Ginette. "Toubab La!": Literary Representations of Mixed-race Characters in the African Diaspora. Newcastle, England: Cambridge Scholars Pub., 2007.
Cartelli, Thomas (1995), "After the Tempest: Shakespeare, Postcoloniality, and Michelle Cliff's New, New World Miranda," Contemporary Literature 36(1): 82–102.
Edmondson, Belinda (1993), "Race, Writing, and the Politics of (Re)Writing History: An Analysis of the Novels of Michelle Cliff," Callaloo 16(1): 180–191.
Lima, Maria Helena (1993), "Revolutionary Developments: Michelle Cliff's No Telephone to Heaven and Merle Collins's Angel," Ariel 24(1): 35–56.
Lionnet, Francoise (1992), "Of Mangoes and Maroons: Language, History, and the Multicultural Subject of Michelle Cliff's Abeng," in Sidonie Smith and Julia Watson (eds), De/Colonizing the Subject: The Politics of Gender in Women's Autobiography, Minneapolis: University of Minnesota Press, pp. 321–345.
.
Raiskin, Judith (1994), "Inverts and Hybrids: Lesbian Rewritings of Sexual and Racial Identities," in Laura Doan, ed. The Lesbian Postmodern, New York: Columbia University Press, pp. 156–172.
Raiskin, Judith (1993), "The Art of History: An Interview with Michelle Cliff," Kenyon Review 15(1): 57–71.
Schwartz, Meryl F. (1993), "An Interview with Michelle Cliff," Contemporary Literature 34(4): 595–619.

References

External links
 Bio at Emory University

1946 births
2016 deaths
20th-century American novelists
Lesbian feminists
American lesbian writers
Jamaican feminists
Jamaican women novelists
Jamaican LGBT writers
African-American feminists
American feminists
Wagner College alumni
Alumni of the Warburg Institute
Trinity College (Connecticut) faculty
Emory University faculty
Emigrants from British Jamaica to the United States
American women short story writers
American women novelists
American LGBT novelists
20th-century American women writers
African-American short story writers
Deaths from liver failure
20th-century American short story writers
African-American novelists
20th-century Jamaican novelists
21st-century Jamaican novelists
Novelists from Connecticut
Novelists from Georgia (U.S. state)
21st-century American women writers
American women academics
20th-century African-American women writers
20th-century African-American writers
21st-century African-American women writers
21st-century African-American writers